Grind the Ocean is the debut studio album from UK based progressive metal band The Safety Fire. The album was initially due to be released on February 27, 2012 in Europe and the February 28, in North America. However, the official release date was pushed back to April 9, 2012 in Europe and April 10, 2012 in North America. Anyone who pre-ordered the album from the band's official website, received a special edition of the album on the original set release dates. The album was mastered by Jens Bogren at Fascination Street Studios.

Track listing

Personnel
 Sean McWeeney — vocals
 Derya 'Dez' Nagle — guitars, producer
 Joaquin Ardiles — guitars
 Lori Peri — bass
 Calvin Smith — drums

References

2012 albums
The Safety Fire albums